Sarah Longfield is an American YouTuber, musician, and multi-instrumentalist based in Madison, Wisconsin. She is known for her two-handed tapping style of playing and the use of an eight-string guitar.

Career

Longfield started her YouTube channel in 2007. She gained a boost of followers after collaborating with Rob Scallon on a series of ukulele covers of metal songs. She formed her band, The Fine Constant, in 2012. With them she has released two albums, and the band performs with Longfield on her solo tours. They have toured with acts such as Marty Friedman, Angel Vivaldi, and Polyphia.

In 2017, Longfield contributed a track to She Rocks, Vol. 1, a compilation released by the record label Favored Nations. In 2018, she signed with label Season of Mist and released the album Disparity. She produced the album herself. The label also reissued her prior album, Collapse // Expand.

Longfield was named on a list of "15 of the World's Greatest Seven- and Eight-String Guitarists" by Guitar World in 2018. In 2019, her signature series guitar was developed by Strandberg Guitars.

In 2021, Longfield joined John 5 on tour.

Discography
Studio albums
Collapse // Expand (2017)
Disparity (2018)
SUM (2019)

Extended plays
Zeal (2011)
 Par Avion (2012)
Oneiric EP (2013)
Kikiria (2014)
Velvet Nectar (2016)
Dusk (2020)

Collaborations
Myriad (2012) – The Fine Constant
Woven in Light (2015) – The Fine Constant
She Rocks, Vol. 1 (2017) – Various artists

References

Living people
American heavy metal musicians
Progressive metal guitarists
Eight-string guitarists
American YouTubers
Music YouTubers
Musicians from Madison, Wisconsin
Year of birth missing (living people)